George Armistead (April 10, 1780 – April 25, 1818) was an American military officer who served as the commander of Fort McHenry during the Battle of Baltimore in the War of 1812.

Life and career
Armistead was born on the Newmarket Plantation in Caroline County, Virginia (now in Milford).

His military career began during the Quasi War with France when he was commissioned as an ensign in the 7th U.S. Infantry Regiment on January 14, 1799.  He was promoted to 2nd lieutenant on March 3 of the same year and to 1st lieutenant on May 14, 1800.  With the reduction in the Army after the Quasi War, he was discharged from the Army on June 15, 1800.

He re-entered the Army on February 16, 1801, when he was commissioned as a lieutenant in the 2nd Regiment of Artillerists and Engineers.  He was promoted to captain on November 1, 1806.

War of 1812
He was one of five brothers who served in the War of 1812, either in the regular army or militia.  He was promoted to major of the 3rd Artillery Regiment on March 3, 1813.

He distinguished himself at the capture of Fort George from the British, near the mouth of Niagara River in Canada on May 27, 1813, while serving as an artillery officer at Fort Niagara. He would later carry the captured British flags to President James Madison. Upon his arrival in Washington, Armistead was ordered to "take command of Fort McHenry."

Defense of Fort McHenry
 
When he arrived at Fort McHenry, located in the outer harbor of Baltimore, Maryland, Armistead ordered "a flag so large that the British would have no difficulty seeing it from a distance". That flag, known as the Star-Spangled Banner Flag, measured 42' × 30', and was made by Baltimore resident Mary Pickersgill, her daughter, and seven seamstresses, and would be later memorialized by Francis Scott Key in the poem "The Star-Spangled Banner", which became the American national anthem in 1931.

During the nearly 25-hour bombardment of Fort McHenry, commencing before dawn on September 13 until the morning of September 14, 1814, Armistead alone knew the fort's magazine was not bombproof. When a shell crashed through the roof of the magazine but failed to explode, Armistead ordered the powder barrels cleared out and placed under the rear walls of the fort. Remarkably, only four men were killed, when two shells smashed into the fort's southwest bastion, despite a deadly rain of some 2,000 mortar shells that the British bombardment fleet fired at the fort. Because the Royal Navy proved unable to capture or reduce the fort in order to enter Baltimore harbor to bombard the main American defense line east of the city, British commander-in-chief Vice Admiral Sir Alexander Cochrane wrote to British Army commander Colonel Arthur Brooke that it was up to him whether to decide to attack or withdraw.  Brooke, who had taken over from Major-General Robert Ross, who was mortally wounded just before the Battle of North Point on September 12, decided to withdraw.

Later life

Following the battle, Armistead was soon promoted to the rank of lieutenant colonel. Much weakened by the arduous preparations for the battle, he died at age 38, only three years later; according to historian Benson Lossing, "the tax upon his nervous system during that bombardment left him with a disease of the heart ... on the 25 of April, 1818 he expired, at the age of thirty eight years." His funeral procession was described as "immense" and his name was immortalized by the construction of a marble monument which overlooks the city.

Family
Armistead's brother, Brevet Brigadier General Walker Keith Armistead, graduated from West Point in 1803.  He was chief engineer of the Army from 1818 to 1821 and then served as colonel of the 3d Artillery Regiment until his death in 1845.  He had a total of 42 years of service as a commissioned officer.

A nephew of Armistead's, Lewis Armistead, the son of Walker Armistead, was a well known Confederate General in the American Civil War who died at the Battle of Gettysburg.

The Star-Spangled Banner was given to Armistead following the bombardment of Fort McHenry, and was passed down through the family. His grandson, Ebenezer Appleton, lent it to the Smithsonian Institution in 1907 and made the loan permanent in 1912.

Dates of rank
Ensign, 7th U.S. Infantry – January 14, 1799
2nd lieutenant – March 3, 1799
1st lieutenant – May 14, 1800
Discharged – June 15, 1800.
1st lieutenant, 2nd Regiment of Artillerists and Engineers – February 16, 1801
Captain – November 1, 1806
Major, 3rd Artillery Regiment – March 3, 1813
Brevet Lieutenant Colonel – September 14, 1814

References

Notes

Bibliography
 George, Christopher T., Terror on the Chesapeake: The War of 1812 on the Bay, Shippensburg, Pa., White Mane, 2001, 
 Pitch, Anthony S.The Burning of Washington, Annapolis: Naval Institute Press, 2000. 
 Whitehorne, Joseph A., The Battle for Baltimore 1814, Baltimore: Nautical & Aviation Publishing, 1997, 
 Lord, Walter, The Dawn's Early Light, New York, N.Y., 1972,

External links



1780 births
1818 deaths
People from Caroline County, Virginia
United States Army personnel of the War of 1812
United States Army officers